Smiliinae is a subfamily of treehoppers in the family Membracidae. These are bugs and include about 100 genera in 10 tribes.

Tribes and genera
These genera belong to the subfamily Smiliinae:

 incertae sedis
 Antianthe Fowler, 1895
 Hemicardiacus Plummer, 1945
 Smilirhexia McKamey, 2008
 Tropidarnis Fowler, 1894
 tribe Acutalini Fowler, 1895
 Acutalis Fairmaire, 1846
 Bordoniana Sakakibara, 1999
 Cornutalis Sakakibara, 1998
 Euritea Stål, 1867
 Thrasymedes (insect) Kirkaldy, 1904
 tribe Amastrini Goding, 1926
 Amastris (insect) Stål, 1862
 Aurimastris Evangelista and Sakakibara, 2007
 Bajulata Ball, 1933
 Erosne Stål, 1867
 Harmonides Kirkaldy, 1902
 Hygris Stål, 1862
 Idioderma Van Duzee, 1909
 Lallemandia Funkhouser, 1922
 Neotynelia Creão-Duarte and Sakakibara, 2000
 Tynelia Stål, 1858
 Vanduzea Goding, 1892 
 tribe Ceresini Goding, 1892
 Amblyophallus Kopp and Yonke, 1979
 Anisostylus Caldwell, 1949
 Antonae Stål, 1867
 Ceresa Amyot and Serville, 1843
 Clepsydrius Fowler, 1895
 Cyphonia Laporte, 1832
 Eucyphonia Sakakibara, 1968
 Hadrophallus Kopp and Yonke, 1979
 Ilithucia Stål, 1867
 Melusinella Metcalf, 1965
 Paraceresa Kopp and Yonke, 1979
 Parantonae Fowler, 1895
 Poppea Stål, 1867
 Proxolonia Sakakibara, 1969
 Spissistilus Caldwell, 1949
 Stictocephala Stål, 1869
 Stictolobus Metcalf, 1916
 Tapinolobus Sakakibara, 1969
 Tortistilus Caldwell, 1949
 Trichaetipyga Caldwell, 1949
 Vestistiloides Andrade, 2003
 Vestistilus Caldwell, 1949 
 tribe Micrutalini Haupt, 1929
 Micrutalis Fowler, 1895
 Trachytalis Fowler, 1895 
 tribe Polyglyptini Goding, 1892
 Adippe Stål, 1867
 Aphetea Fowler, 1895
 Bilimekia Fowler, 1895
 Bryantopsis Ball, 1937
 Creonus Sakakibara, 1996
 Dioclophara Kirkaldy, 1904
 Ennya Stål, 1866
 Entylia Germar, 1833
 Gelastogonia Kirkaldy, 1904
 Hemiptycha Germar, 1833
 Heranice Stål, 1867
 Maturnaria Metcalf, 1952
 Membracidoidea Goding, 1929
 Mendicea Goding, 1926
 Metheisa Fowler, 1896
 Notogonioides McKamey, 1997
 Paraphetea Sakakibara and Creão-Duarte, 2000
 Phormophora Stål, 1869
 Polyglypta Burmeister, 1835
 Polyglyptodes Fowler, 1895
 Publilia Stål, 1866
 Ramedia Creão-Duarte and Sakakibara, 1989
 Sturmella Spinola, 1850
 tribe Quadrinareini Deitz, 1975
 Quadrinarea Goding, 1927
 tribe Smiliini Stål, 1866
 Ashmeadea Goding, 1892
 Atymna Stål, 1867
 Atymnina Plummer, 1938
 Cyrtolobus Goding, 1892
 Godingia Fowler, 1896
 Grandolobus Ball, 1932
 Ophiderma Fairmaire, 1846
 Smilia Germar, 1833
 Xantholobus Van Duzee, 1908 
 tribe Telamonini Goding, 1892
 Archasia Stål, 1867
 Carynota Fitch, 1851
 Glossonotus Butler, 1877
 Heliria Stål, 1867
 Helonica Ball, 1931
 Palonica Ball, 1931
 Telamona Fitch, 1851
 Telamonanthe Baker, 1907
 Telonaca Ball, 1918
 Thelia Amyot and Serville, 1843 
 tribe Thuridini Deitz, 1975
 Flynnia McKamey, 2017
 Thuris Funkhouser, 1943
 tribe Tragopini Stål, 1866
 Anobilia Tode, 1966
 Chelyoidea Buckton, 1902
 Colisicostata McKamey, 1994
 Horiola Fairmaire, 1846
 Stilbophora Stål, 1869
 Todea (insect) McKamey, 1994
 Tragopa Latreille, 1829
 Tropidolomia'' Stål, 1869

References

Further reading

External links
 

 
Membracidae